Edythe Amy Macready known as Dot and married name Fairbairn (1908–1994) was a Jersey female diver who competed for England.

Diving career
Macready trained in the Havre des Pas Pool and won a gold medal in the 10 Metres Platform at the 1934 British Empire Games in London.

Dot was the English ladies champion in 1933.

References

1908 births
1994 deaths
English female divers
Jersey athletes
Jersey sportswomen
Divers at the 1934 British Empire Games
Commonwealth Games medallists in diving
Commonwealth Games gold medallists for England
Medallists at the 1934 British Empire Games